Mathira Constituency is an electoral constituency in Kenya. It is one of six constituencies in Nyeri County. The constituency was established for the 1963 elections. Mathira is popularly known as Mathira ya Githomo (education). It has the most educated population in the country. It sits at the foot of Mount Kenya. Mathira is known for growing tea and coffee. Karatina is to the east. Several tarmac roads crisscross Mathira, including the Kenol-Marua superhighway. 

Education institutions include Karatina University, Tumutumu Girls High School, Kanjuri High School, Karatina Girls, and Bishop Gatimu Ngandu Girls High School. Health facilities include Karatina Hospital, Jamii Hospital, PCEA Tumutumu hospital and many dispensaries. 

Kagochi tea factory is the largest private employer. Mountain Lodge leads in tourism.

Members of Parliament

Wards

References 

Constituencies in Nyeri County
Constituencies in Central Province (Kenya)
1963 establishments in Kenya
Constituencies established in 1963